Accretion may refer to:

Science
 Accretion (astrophysics), the formation of planets and other bodies by collection of material through gravity
 Accretion (meteorology), the process by which water vapor in clouds forms water droplets around nucleation sites
 Accretion (coastal management), the process where coastal sediments return to the visible portion of the beach following storm erosion
 Accretion (geology), the increase in size of a tectonic plate by addition of material along a convergent boundary
Accretionary wedge

Other uses
 Accretion (finance), predictable changes in the price of certain securities